The 2009–10 Rugby Pro D2 was the second-level French rugby union club competition, behind the Top 14, for the 2009–10 season. It ran alongside the 2009–10 Top 14 competition; both competitions were operated by the Ligue Nationale de Rugby (LNR).

Dax and Mont-de-Marsan, the two major clubs from the Landes département, got relegated at the end of the previous Top 14 season and replaced Racing Métro and Albi, who gained promotion to the Top 14. This season also welcomed Lannemezan and Aix-en-Provence, respectively Fédérale 1 champions and runners-up, who took the place of Bourg-en-Bresse and Béziers, the previous year's two bottom finishers.

Agen, who had been a favorite for promotion ever since they were relegated at the end of the 2006–07 season, finally lived up to the expectations and dominated the championship from the start, finishing with an 11-point margin over second-placed Lyon and thus earning promotion to the 2010–11 Top 14 season. Lyon and La Rochelle made the most of the home ground advantage to qualify for the promotion final with victories over Pau and Oyonnax, respectively, and faced each other in the final. La Rochelle, despite having lost both confrontations against Lyon during the regular season, triumphed 32–26 and earned the right to accompany Agen in the Top 14 after eight years spent in Pro D2.

The two newly promoted teams, Aix-en-Provence and Lannemezan, were not able to rival the other teams and from early on in the season occupied the bottom two places that they kept until the end. Lannemezan in particular finished with three wins out of thirty games (one of which was against arch-rivals Tarbes), amounting to 19 points, the poorest record in the Pro D2 since the introduction of the bonus points.

However, in a new twist of events, Montauban, who were already relegated to Pro D2 for financial reasons (thus saving Bayonne's spot in the Top 14), failed their audit on June 10, and were further relegated to Fédérale 1. Their decision not to appeal the DNACG's ruling also meant that Aix would be reprieved and compete again in Pro D2 for the next year.

Previous season

At the end of the previous season, Racing Métro were champions and thus automatically promoted to Top 14. They were eventually followed by Albi, who defeated Oyonnax in the final of the promotion playoffs to secure a spot in the 2009–10 Top 14. Bourg-en-Bresse, which had been newly promoted to Pro D2 for the 2008–09 season, finished second-to-bottom of the table and were initially relegated to Fédérale 1, but were further relegated by French sporting authorities to Fédérale 2 due to financial problems. Béziers finished bottom of the league; they would have however stayed in Pro D2 for the next season, had Tarbes not successfully appealed the decision of the DNACG (Direction nationale d'aide et de contrôle de gestion), the LNR's financial arm, to relegate them to Fédérale 1. The other promoted team in 2008–09, Colomiers, stayed up, finishing in 14th, the first safe spot.

Lannemezan and Aix-en-Provence earned promotion from Fédérale 1 for the 2009–10 season, while Dax and Mont-de-Marsan were relegated from the 2008–09 Top 14.

Competition format
The top team at the end of the regular season (after all the teams played one another twice, once at home, once away), is declared champion and earns a spot in the next Top 14 season. Teams ranked second to fifth compete in promotion playoffs, with the semifinals being played at the home ground of the higher-ranked team. The final is then played on neutral ground, and the winner earned the second ticket to the next Top 14.

The LNR uses a slightly different bonus points system from that used in most other rugby competitions. It trialled a new system in 2007–08 explicitly designed to prevent a losing team from earning more than one bonus point in a match, a system that also made it impossible for either team to earn a bonus point in a drawn match. LNR chose to continue with this system for subsequent seasons.

France's bonus point system operates as follows:

 4 points for a win.
 2 points for a draw.
 1 "bonus" point for winning while scoring at least 3 more tries than the opponent. This replaces the standard bonus point for scoring 4 tries regardless of the match result.
 1 "bonus" point for losing by 7 points (or less).

Season table

{| class="wikitable" width="450px" style="float:left; font-size:95%; margin-left:15px;"
| colspan="2"  style="text-align:center; background:#fff;" cellpadding="0" cellspacing="0"|Key to colors
|-
| style="background: #3fff00;" |     
|Champions automatically promoted to Top 14
|-
| style="background: #fde910;" |     
|Winner of playoffs between second- through fifth-place teams for the second promotion place
|-
| style="background:#ccf;"|     
|Remaining participants in promotion playoffs
|-
| style="background: #ff79B4;" |     
|Bottom two teams are relegated to Fédérale 1(Aix were reprieved when Top 14's Montauban were relegated directly to Fédérale 1)
|}

 :  Mont-de-Marsan were docked five points by the DNACG due to their failure to act upon their financial difficulties. This penalty also causes them to finish behind Dax in the table despite a better head-to-head record (5–4).

Results

Key
The score of the game is given by the middle (third and fourth) columns. The first and last column indicate the number of tries scored by the home and the away team, respectively. A blue border indicates that the team has earned an attacking bonus point (i.e. has scored at least three more tries than its opponent), a yellow one that the team has earned a defensive bonus point (defeat by 7 points or less). If a team earns both bonus points, this will be indicated by a green border.

Promotion playoffs
All times CEST.

Semi-finals

Final

See also
 2009–10 Top 14 season

Notes and references

External links
 LNR.fr

2009-10
Pro D2